Cleouna Moore (October 31, 1924 or 1929 – October 25, 1973) was an American actress, usually featured in the role of a blonde bombshell in Hollywood films of the 1950s, including seven films with Hugo Haas. She also became a well-known pin-up girl.

Early life
Cleouna Moore was born either in 1924 or 1929 in Galvez, Louisiana, and raised in nearby Gonzales. Her father ran a grocery store. She was educated in Gonzales public schools and took a secretarial course at Pope's Commercial College in Baton Rouge.

She married Palmer Long, the youngest child of Huey Long, the former governor of Louisiana who was assassinated while a Senator for Louisiana, but the marriage ended in six weeks. She moved with her family to California in 1945, determined to enter motion pictures. 

Moore was named Miss Van Nuys for 1947-1948.

Career
She made her film debut in 1948 in Embraceable You. She also played the leading lady in the film serial Congo Bill and worked for Warner Brothers briefly in 1950. She worked for RKO Radio Pictures from 1950 to 1952, making such films as Hunt the Man Down and Gambling House.

She signed with Columbia Pictures in 1952. The studio had plans to mold Moore as its next film star, hoping she would bring Columbia the success that 20th Century-Fox was having with Marilyn Monroe. In order to compete with Monroe, Moore had to bleach her hair platinum blonde. Columbia dubbed her "The Next Big Thing" and "The Blonde Rita Hayworth". She first gained attention as a doomed gun moll in Nicholas Ray's film noir On Dangerous Ground in 1952.

Moore began starring in films in 1952. In 1953, she made one of her most remembered movies, One Girl's Confession, opposite Hugo Haas, who directed and appeared with her in several other films. She co-starred in Thy Neighbor's Wife (1953) and Bait (1954), both directed by Haas, the latter co-starring John Agar.

In 1954, she starred in The Other Woman, playing a B-movie bit player who strikes at her movie director for revenge when he declines the offer for her to be in his picture. During 1954, Moore's career began to fade in the eyes of Columbia. The studio signed newcomer Kim Novak to a contract and started molding Novak as its new star on the lot and started casting Moore in forgettable B-movies.

Upon completing a supporting role in Women's Prison (1955), Moore signed a brief deal with Universal Pictures to play a suicidal prostitute in the low-budget thriller Hold Back Tomorrow (1955), again opposite Agar.

In 1956, she starred as a predatory career girl in Over-Exposed, co-starring Richard Crenna. The following year, Moore made her final film appearance in Hit and Run (1957). After the release of the film, Moore retired from acting.

During this period of 1950s Hollywood, Moore was one of several buxom blondes to achieve notability following Marilyn Monroe's major breakthrough; the others included Jayne Mansfield, Mamie Van Doren, Diana Dors, Sheree North, Anita Ekberg, Barbara Lang, Barbara Nichols, Joi Lansing, Carol Ohmart, Pat Sheehan, and Greta Thyssen. In the mid 1950s, Columbia considered starring Moore in a film biography of Jean Harlow, but the project did not come to pass.

Post Hollywood

Moore found success as a businesswoman in real estate after her screen career ended.

Personal life
After her six-week marriage to Palmer Long, Moore remained single through the 1940s and 1950s. In 1961, Moore married multi-millionaire real estate developer Herbert Heftler, and lived on an estate on Coldwater Canyon in Beverly Hills for the remaining 12 years of her life.

Death 
Moore died in her sleep in 1973. She was either 44 or 49 years old. Her remains are buried at Inglewood Park Cemetery.

Partial filmography

 Embraceable You (1948) - Sylvia (uncredited)
 Congo Bill (1948, Serial) - Lureen / Ruth Culver
 Dynamite Pass (1950) - Lulu
 Bright Leaf (1950) - Louise - Cousn (uncredited)
 711 Ocean Drive (1950) - Mal's Date (uncredited)
 The Great Jewel Robber (1950) - Vivacious Blonde at Airport (uncredited)
 Rio Grande Patrol (1950) - Peppie
 Hunt the Man Down (1950) - Pat Sheldon
 Gambling House (1950) - Sally
 On Dangerous Ground (1951) - Myrna Bowers
 The Pace That Thrills (1952) - Ruby
 Strange Fascination (1952) - Margo
 One Girl's Confession (1953) - Mary Adams
 Thy Neighbor's Wife (1953) - Lita Vojnar
 Bait (1954) - Peggy
 The Other Woman (1954) - Sherry Steward
 Women's Prison (1955) - Mae
 Hold Back Tomorrow (1955) - Dora
 Over-Exposed (1956) - Lila Crane
 Hit and Run (1957) - Julie Hilmer (final film role)

References

External links

 
 
 The Private Life and Times of Cleo Moore
 
 

Actresses from Baton Rouge, Louisiana
People from Gonzales, Louisiana
Age controversies
1973 deaths
20th-century American actresses
American film actresses
Columbia Pictures contract players